"The Roof Is on Fire" is a song by Rock Master Scott & the Dynamic Three, released as a single in 1984. It reached number five on the Billboard Hot Dance Music/Maxi-Singles Sales chart. It is known for its chorus:

It is also known for the lyric "Now throw your hands in the air and wave 'em like you just don't care" which, like the title lyric, has been interpolated in many other songs and used as a meme in pop culture in general.
 
The intro of "The Roof Is on Fire" is sampled by the Chemical Brothers in their song "Hey Boy Hey Girl", and the chorus is interpolated in the Bloodhound Gang's "Fire Water Burn", Coal Chamber's "Sway", Rancid's "Burn", Quad City DJ's "Party Over Here", YACHT's "Dystopia (The Earth Is on Fire)", The Soca Boys' "Follow the Leader" and Bratmobile's "Polaroid Baby".

Chart performance

Parody
The riff was parodied by Uncle Jamm's Army and the California Cat Crew (produced by Rodger Clayton) as "The roach, the roach, the roach is on the wall, we don't need no Raid, let the silly sucker crawl."

References

External links

1984 songs
1984 singles
American hip hop songs
Hip hop phrases
Fantasy Records singles